Niels Van Den Eynde (born 27 December 2000) is a Belgian basketball player for Liège Basket of the BNXT League.

Professional career
Van Den Eynde played for BC Guco Lier in his younger years, and helped the team promote to the Belgian Second Division. He averaged 23 points, 4 rebounds and 5 in the 2019–20 national second division.

On 15 May 2020, he signed a contract with Telenet Giants Antwerp. In his rookie year, he averaged 5.3 points per game. In his second year, he averaged 7.2 points and 2.9 assists per game in 16.2 minutes.

On April 16, 2022, he has signed with Liège Basket of the BNXT League.

References

2000 births
Living people
Antwerp Giants players
Belgian men's basketball players
Liège Basket players
Point guards